Chad Rudolph (born January 22, 1948) is an American rower. He competed in the men's coxed four event at the 1972 Summer Olympics.

References

External links
 

1948 births
Living people
American male rowers
Olympic rowers of the United States
Rowers at the 1972 Summer Olympics
Rowers from Seattle